Orlando Lattmann (born 25 August 1989) is a footballer from Switzerland who retires from professional football 2011.

See also
Football in Switzerland
List of football clubs in Switzerland

References

External links

Profile
FC Zurich stats

1989 births
Swiss men's footballers
Living people
FC Zürich players
Association football goalkeepers